Meteor Stadium is a multi-use stadium in Zhukovsky, Russia.  It is  used mostly for football matches, on club level by FC Saturn-2 Moscow Oblast of the Russian Second Division.  It is also used for athletics competitions, including the Znamensky Memorial.  The stadium has a capacity of 7,500 spectators.

References

External links
Official website

Football venues in Russia
Athletics (track and field) venues in Russia
Buildings and structures in Moscow Oblast